This is a list of islands of Denmark.

Overview
There are about 406 islands in Denmark, not including the Faroe Islands or Greenland. Some 70 of them are populated while the rest are uninhabited. Some of the uninhabited islands have only become uninhabited in recent decades, for economic reasons, as lighthouses and other publicly run facilities either became automated, or relocated to main islands or Jutland peninsula. Others became uninhabited as living costs outpaced income for the often fewer than 10 locals.

Definition
Different lists of Danish islands vary, depending on how the word "island" is defined. According to the official Danish Government definition, an "island" needs to be surrounded by water at least one-half metre deep, and also to have land vegetation.

Another common criterion is that an "island" needs to be surrounded by free-flowing, natural water and not just an artificial, narrow canal. According to this criterion, places such as Christianshavn and Holmen in Copenhagen, although sometimes referred to as artificial islands, are actually parts of the island of Amager.

Dynamic number

The number of islands in Denmark changes from time to time. New islands are occasionally formed by sedimentation. Several examples of these new islands are found in the waters around Æbelø, north of Funen, including Drætlingen which formed in the late 1990s, and a still unnamed islet that was registered in 2008. These new islands are generally less stable than larger, morainic islands, and may later disappear again. Other islands are created artificially. Peberholm, formed in the process of construction of the Øresund Bridge, is a notable example. Other artificial Danish islands include a number of marine fortresses off Copenhagen, such as Middelgrundsfortet, Trekroner Fort and Flakfortet.

Islands may also disappear. An example of this is Jordsand, one of the Danish Wadden Sea Islands. According to records from 1231, the island then had an area of about 2,000 hectares (8 square miles). After a series of severe storms during that century, its area decreased to around 41 hectares, and by 1763 to around 18 hectares. By December 1999, the European windstorm Cyclone Anatol had destroyed the last piece of the island and Jordsand had ceased to exist.

In other cases, islands are absorbed by larger neighbouring masses of dry land, as a result of either natural sedimentation or artificial land reclamation in the channels separating them. Sometimes this means that an island becomes a cape or headland, or a peninsula as is the case of the former island of Reersø.

Denmark's second largest island, the North Jutlandic Island, was not always an island. A storm on 3 February 1825 penetrated the narrow land mass, Agger Tange, and thus separated Northern Jutland from the rest of Jutland. The area had earlier been an island, when a strait at Vust had been open prior to the 12th century.

List of 100 largest Danish islands
This is a list of the 100 largest islands of Denmark (press the symbol after the headings in the table to rearrange the list according to population size, location or alphabetically):

Other populated islands
 Frederiksø - see Christiansø above
 Store Okseø, 3 inhabitants
 Egholm

Areas sometimes referred to as islands
 Jordsand, a former island
 Vejlø, a peninsula but in some sources referred to as an island
 Christianshavn, considered part of Amager Island
 Holmen, considered part of Christianshavn/Amager

Other small unpopulated islands
 Lindholm, Stege Bugt (which has a medical research facility)

See also
 Danish straits
 Faroe Islands
 Greenland
 List of islands in the Atlantic Ocean
 Lists of islands

References

External links
Statistics Denmark Populated islands
National survey authority
Danish Wikipedia List of inhabited islands

Denmark
 
Islands